Stadionul Steaua is the name of several football stadiums. It may refer to:

 Stadionul Steaua (1974) - the original stadium, demolished in 2018
 Stadionul Steaua (2021) - its replacement